The following is a timeline of the history of the city of Almaty, Almaty Province, Kazakhstan.

19th century

 1870s – Panfilov Park laid out.
 1871 – Population: 12,000.
 1884 – Synagogue established.
 1887 – 9 June: A magnitude 7.3 earthquake affected the city with a maximum Mercalli intensity of X (Extreme), causing moderate damage.

20th century

 1907 – Ascension Cathedral built.
 1910 – Population: 24,798.
 1911 – 3 January: An earthquake with a magnitude of 7.7–8.7 affected the city with a maximum Mercalli intensity of X–XI (Extreme), causing 450 deaths and severe damage.
 1914 – Population: 36,000.
 1918 – Soviets in power; city becomes part of the Turkestan Autonomous Soviet Socialist Republic.
 1921 – City renamed "Alma-Ata."
 1927 – Capital of the Kazak Autonomous Socialist Soviet Republic relocates to Alma-Ata from Kyzylorda.
 1928 – Kazakh State Theatre relocates to Alma-Ata.
 1930 – Turkestan-Siberia Railway begins operating.
 1931 – Central State Museum of Kazakhstan and National Library of Kazakhstan established.
 1934
 Abay Opera House and Kazakh State University open.
 Alma-Ata Documentary Film Studio established.
 Uighur Music and Drama theatre group founded.
 1935
 Almaty Airport built.
 National Art Gallery opens.
 1936
 City becomes capital of the Kazakh Soviet Socialist Republic.
 Almaty Zoo opens.
 1939 – Population: 230,528.
 1941 – Central United Film Studio established.
 1944 – Alma-Ata Studio for Feature and Documentary Films established.
 1946 – Kurmangazy Conservatory established.
 1949 – Almaty District Library established.
 1951 – Medeo skating rink opens.
 1954 – Lokomotiv Almaty football club formed.
 1958 – Almaty Central Stadium opens.
 1960 – Republican Scientific-Technical Library established.
 1963 – Korean Theatre relocates to Almaty.
 1967 – Kok Tobe cable car begins operating.
 1970 – Hotel Kazakhstan built.
 1972 – Medeu Dam built.
 1978
 Republican Book Museum opens.
 September: International Conference on Primary Health Care held.
 1979 – Population: 975,000.
 1980 – Kazakhstan National Museum of Instruments founded.
 1983 – Almaty Tower built.
 1985 – Population: 1,068,000 (estimate).
 1986 – December: Jeltoqsan protests against Soviet regime.
 1989 – Voice of Asia lip synching contest begins.
 1991
 21 December: Alma-Ata Protocol signed, establishing the Commonwealth of Independent States.
 City becomes capital of independent Republic of Kazakhstan.
 1992
 Karavan begins publication.
 Central State Archives of Recent History headquartered in city.
 Akhmetzhan Yesimov becomes head of Alma-Ata regional government.
 1993
 City renamed "Almaty."
 Kazakh Interbank Currency Exchange headquartered in Almaty.
 Kazakhskaya Pravda in publication.
 Kazakhstan Institute for Strategic Studies founded.
 Population: 1,176,000 (estimate).
 1995 – Katelco established.
 1997
 State capital relocates from Almaty to Astana.
 Zamanbek Nurkadilov becomes governor of the Almaty region.
 1998 – Mukhtar Auezov Museum-House built.
 2000
 Respublika (Kazakh newspaper) begins publication.
 Football Club Tsesna formed.

21st century

 2001 – Public Policy Research Center, and Center for Foreign Policy and Analysis founded.
 2003 – International Institute for Modern Politics founded.
 2006 – Protest.
 2007 – Almaty Cup tennis tournament begins.
 2008
 Haileybury Almaty school founded.
 Akhmetzhan Yessimov becomes mayor.
 2009 – Population: 1,365,105.
 2011
 Almaty Metro begins operating.
 2011 Asian Winter Games held.
 2012 – Population: 1,472,866.
 2013
 January: Airplane crash near city.
 City hosts P5+1-Iran meetings.
 2014 – Economic protest.
 2015 – Baibek Bauyrzhan becomes mayor.

See also
 Almaty history
 List of Akims of Almaty City
 List of universities in Almaty
 Other names of Almaty
 History of Kazakhstan

References

Bibliography

External links

 Photos of market in Almaty, 1995, by Carl Malamud

almaty
Almaty
almaty

Almaty